Gabriella Then (born October 22, 1995) is an American professional golfer who plays on the Epson Tour and the Ladies European Tour.

Early life, college and amateur career
Then was born in Whittier, California and grew up in Rancho Cucamonga, California. She is of Chinese, Indonesian and Dutch ancestry. Then picked up golf at age five, recorded her first birdie at age eight, and started tournament golf at nine. She qualified for the U.S. Women's Amateur at age 12, and competed in her first U.S. Women's Open at age 14. 

In 2011, Then was part of the victorious United States team at the Junior Solheim Cup in Ireland. Two years later, she won the 2013 U.S. Girls' Junior Championship at Sycamore Hills Golf Club in Fort Wayne.

Then attended the University of Southern California where she studied communications and played college golf with the USC Trojans women's golf team between 2013 and 2017. Her teammates included later LPGA members Sophia Popov and Annie Park, and they came close at the national championship on two occasions, including the 2015 NCAA Championship where they lost in the semi-finals. She had one college win, was named All-American in 2015, and set the school record for rounds played (245) over the course of her four-year career.

Professional career
Then turned professional in 2017 and joined the Epson Tour. After three seasons, with a best finish of T4 at the 2017 PHC Classic, Then gave up professional golf and took a job in marketing and sales at a cosmetics company.

In 2021, after an 18 months break, Then began playing tournament golf again and played on the Cactus Tour and the WAPT Tour, where she won her first professional events. She won the LET Q-School at the La Manga Club and started playing on the Ladies European Tour in 2022. 

In April 2022, she won the Garden City Charity Classic at Buffalo Dunes, her first title on the Epson Tour.

Personal life
Then met her partner Eric Sugimoto, a professional golfer who has played on the Japan Golf Tour, at USC.

Amateur wins
2011 Rolex Tournament of Champions
2013 Scott Robertson Memorial, U.S. Girls' Junior Championship
2015 UC Irvine Invitational

Source:

Professional wins (2)

Epson Tour wins (1)

Women's All Pro Tour wins (1)
2021 Kathy Whitworth Paris Championship

Results in LPGA majors

CUT = missed the half-way cut
T = tied

U.S. national team appearances
Amateur
Junior Solheim Cup: 2011 (winners)

References

External links

American female golfers
USC Trojans women's golfers
Ladies European Tour golfers
Golfers from Los Angeles
1995 births
Living people